Western Siberia or West Siberia is a part of the larger region of Siberia that is mostly located in the Russian Federation. It lies between the Ural region and the Yenisei River, which conventionally divides Siberia into two halves.

The largest rivers of the region are the Irtysh and the Ob.

The West Siberian petroleum basin is the largest hydrocarbon (petroleum and natural gas) basin in the world covering an area of about 2.2 million km2, and is also the largest oil and gas producing region in Russia.

In medieval times, the region was part of the Golden Horde. After its gradual decline during the 15th century, the Khanate of Sibir, centered on Tyumen, was formed within the area. In the late 16th century, most of Western Siberia was conquered by the Russian Empire, while its southern region became part of the Kazakh Khanate. The current international borders between Russia and Kazakhstan came into being in the late 20th century following the dissolution of the Soviet Union.

Major cities
The most populous city of Western Siberia is Novosibirsk. Other major cities include:

 Omsk
 Tyumen
 Surgut
 Barnaul
 Tomsk
 Kokshetau
 Kemerovo
 Novokuznetsk
 Kurgan
 Pavlodar
 Petropavl
 Semey
 Oskemen

References

Geography of Siberia
Geography of Kazakhstan
Regions of Russia